Dunbar Wilson Johnston Duncan (8 July 1852 – 12 December 1919) was an English cricketer. He was a right-handed batsman. Duncan played for Hampshire from 1875–1885.

Duncan made his first-class debut against local rivals Sussex at the Green Jackets Ground in 1875. He made his final appearance for the club during the 1885 County season against Somerset in what was to be the club's final season with first-class status until the 1895 County Championship. In all Duncan played seventeen first-class matches for the club, making four half centuries with a high score of 87*.

Duncan died in Regent's Park, London on 12 December 1919.

Family
Duncan had a brother, fellow Hampshire player Arthur Duncan.

External links
Dunbar Duncan at Cricinfo
Dunbar Duncan at CricketArchive
Dunbar Duncan at CricketArchive

1852 births
1919 deaths
Cricketers from Southampton
English cricketers
Hampshire cricketers